The World Wide Web has become a major delivery platform for a variety of complex and sophisticated enterprise applications in several domains. In addition to their inherent multifaceted functionality, these Web applications exhibit complex behaviour and place some unique demands on their usability, performance, security, and ability to grow and evolve. However, a vast majority of these applications continue to be developed in an ad hoc way, contributing to problems of usability, maintainability, quality and reliability. While Web development can benefit from established practices from other related disciplines, it has certain distinguishing characteristics that demand special considerations. In recent years, there have been developments towards addressing these considerations.

Web engineering focuses on the methodologies, techniques, and tools that are the foundation of Web application development and which support their design, development, evolution, and evaluation. Web application development has certain characteristics that make it different from traditional software, information system, or computer application development.

Web engineering is multidisciplinary and encompasses contributions from diverse areas: systems analysis and design, software engineering, hypermedia/hypertext engineering, requirements engineering, human-computer interaction, user interface, data engineering, information science, information indexing and retrieval, testing, modelling and simulation, project management, and graphic design and presentation. Web engineering is neither a clone nor a subset of software engineering, although both involve programming and software development. While Web Engineering uses software engineering principles, it encompasses new approaches, methodologies, tools, techniques, and guidelines to meet the unique requirements of Web-based applications.

As a discipline 
Proponents of Web engineering supported the establishment of Web engineering as a discipline at an early stage of Web. Major arguments for Web engineering as a new discipline are:

 Web-based Information Systems (WIS) development process is different and unique.
 Web engineering is multi-disciplinary; no single discipline (such as software engineering) can provide complete theory basis, body of knowledge and practices to guide WIS development.
 Issues of evolution and lifecycle management when compared to more 'traditional' applications.
 Web-based information systems and applications are pervasive and non-trivial. The prospect of Web as a platform will continue to grow and it is worth being treated specifically.

However, it has been controversial, especially for people in other traditional disciplines such as software engineering, to recognize Web engineering as a new field. The issue is how different and independent Web engineering is, compared with other disciplines.

Main topics of Web engineering include, but are not limited to, the following areas:

Modeling disciplines 
 Business Processes for Applications on the Web
 Process Modelling of Web applications
 Requirements Engineering for Web applications
 B2B applications

Design disciplines, tools, and methods 
 UML and the Web
 Conceptual Modeling of Web Applications (aka. Web modeling)
 Prototyping Methods and Tools
 Web design methods
 CASE Tools for Web Applications
 Web Interface Design
 Data Models for Web Information Systems

Implementation disciplines 
 Integrated Web Application Development Environments
 Code Generation for Web Applications
 Software Factories for/on the Web
 Web 2.0, AJAX, E4X, ASP.NET, PHP and Other New Developments
 Web Services Development and Deployment

Testing disciplines 
 Testing and Evaluation of Web systems and Applications.
 Testing Automation, Methods, and Tools.

Applications categories disciplines 
 Semantic Web applications
 Document centric Web sites
 Transactional Web applications
 Interactive Web applications
 Workflow-based Web applications
 Collaborative Web applications
 Portal-oriented Web applications
 Ubiquitous and Mobile Web Applications
 Device Independent Web Delivery
 Localization and Internationalization of Web Applications
 Personalization of Web Applications

Attributes

Web quality 
 Web Metrics, Cost Estimation, and Measurement
 Personalisation and Adaptation of Web applications
 Web Quality
 Usability of Web Applications
 Web accessibility
 Performance of Web-based applications

Content-related 
 Web Content Management
 Content Management System (CMS)
 Multimedia Authoring Tools and Software
 Authoring of adaptive hypermedia

Education 
 Master of Science: Web Engineering as a branch of study within the MSc program Web Sciences at the Johannes Kepler University Linz, Austria 
 Diploma in Web Engineering: Web Engineering as a study program at the International Webmasters College (iWMC), Germany

See also 
 DevOps
 Web developer
 Web modeling

References

Sources 
Robert L. Glass, "Who's Right in the Web Development Debate?" Cutter IT Journal, July 2001, Vol. 14, No.7, pp 6–0.
S. Ceri, P. Fraternali, A. Bongio, M. Brambilla, S. Comai, M. Matera. "Designing Data-Intensive Web Applications". Morgan Kaufmann Publisher, Dec 2002,

Web engineering resources
Organizations
International Society for Web Engineering e.V.: http://www.iswe-ev.de/
Web Engineering Community: http://www.webengineering.org
WISE Society: http://www.wisesociety.org/
ACM SIGWEB: http://www.acm.org/sigweb
World Wide Web Consortium: http://www.w3.org

Books
"Engineering Web Applications", by Sven Casteleyn, Florian Daniel, Peter Dolog and Maristella Matera, Springer, 2009, 
"Web Engineering: Modelling and Implementing Web Applications", edited by Gustavo Rossi, Oscar Pastor, Daniel Schwabe and Luis Olsina, Springer Verlag HCIS, 2007, 
"Cost Estimation Techniques for Web Projects", Emilia Mendes, IGI Publishing, 
"Web Engineering - The Discipline of Systematic Development of Web Applications", edited by Gerti Kappel, Birgit Pröll, Siegfried Reich, and Werner Retschitzegger, John Wiley & Sons, 2006
"Web Engineering", edited by Emilia Mendes and Nile Mosley, Springer-Verlag, 2005
"Web Engineering: Principles and Techniques", edited by Woojong Suh, Idea Group Publishing, 2005
"Form-Oriented Analysis -- A New Methodology to Model Form-Based Applications", by Dirk Draheim, Gerald Weber, Springer, 2005
"Building Web Applications with UML" (2nd edition), by Jim Conallen, Pearson Education, 2003
"Information Architecture for the World Wide Web" (2nd edition), by Peter Morville and Louis Rosenfeld, O'Reilly, 2002
"Web Site Engineering: Beyond Web Page Design", by Thomas A. Powell, David L. Jones and Dominique C. Cutts, Prentice Hall, 1998
"Designing Data-Intensive Web Applications", by S. Ceri, P. Fraternali, A. Bongio, M. Brambilla, S. Comai, M. Matera. Morgan Kaufmann Publisher, Dec 2002, 

Conferences
World Wide Web Conference (by IW3C2, since 1994): http://www.iw3c2.org
International Conference on Web Engineering (ICWE) (since 2000)
2018: http://icwe2018.webengineering.org/ (Caceres, Spain)
2017: http://icwe2017.webengineering.org/ (Rome, Italy)
2016: http://icwe2016.webengineering.org/ (Lugano, Switzerland)
2007: http://www.icwe2007.org/
2006: http://www.icwe2006.org
2005: http://www.icwe2005.org
2004: http://www.icwe2004.org
ICWE Conference Proceedings
ICWE2007: LNCS 4607 https://www.springer.com/computer/database+management+&+information+retrieval/book/978-3-540-73596-0
ICWE2005: LNCS 3579 https://www.springer.com/east/home/generic/search/results?SGWID=5-40109-22-58872076-0
ICWE2004: LNCS 3140 https://www.springer.com/east/home/generic/search/results?SGWID=5-40109-22-32445543-0
ICWE2003: LNCS 2722 https://www.springer.com/east/home/generic/search/results?SGWID=5-40109-22-3092664-0
Web Information Systems Engineering Conference (by WISE Society, since 2000): http://www.wisesociety.org/
International Conference on Web Information Systems and Technologies (Webist) (since 2005): http://www.webist.org/
International Workshop on Web Site Evolution (WSE): http://www.websiteevolution.org/
International Conference on Software Engineering: http://www.icse-conferences.org/

Book chapters and articles
Pressman, R.S., 'Applying Web Engineering', Part 3, Chapters 16–20, in Software Engineering: A Practitioner's Perspective, Sixth Edition, McGraw-Hill, New York, 2004. http://www.rspa.com/'

Journals
Journal of Web Engineering: http://www.rintonpress.com/journals/jwe/
International Journal of Web Engineering and Technology: http://www.inderscience.com/browse/index.php?journalID=48
ACM Transactions on Internet Technology: http://toit.acm.org/
World Wide Web (Springer): https://link.springer.com/journal/11280
Web coding journal: http://www.web-code.org/
Web Reference: https://www.kevi.my/

Special issues
Web Engineering, IEEE MultiMedia, Jan.–Mar. 2001 (Part 1) and April–June 2001 (Part 2).  http://csdl2.computer.org/persagen/DLPublication.jsp?pubtype=m&acronym=mu
Usability Engineering, IEEE Software, January–February 2001.
Web Engineering, Cutter IT Journal, 14(7), July 2001.*
Testing E-business Applications, Cutter IT Journal, September 2001.
Engineering Internet Software, IEEE Software, March–April 2002.
Usability and the Web, IEEE Internet Computing, March–April 2002.

Citations

Web development